Vincent Michael Tobin (born September 29, 1943) is an American football coach and former college player who was the head coach of the Arizona Cardinals of the National Football League (NFL).  During his four decades of coaching, he served as defensive coordinator for college, NFL, and Canadian Football League (CFL) teams.

Early life
Vincent and his brother Bill Tobin both were born on a farm near Burlington Junction, Missouri.  Their father Ed Tobin was basketball captain at the Conception Junction, Missouri high school.  The brothers both attended Maryville High School which is 16 miles from Burlington Junction but the family thought their sports prospects would be much better in the much bigger school and they commuted each day to the school. The brothers who are two years apart in age played on the football teams at the same time both in Maryville and at the University of Missouri football team.

College coaching career
Tobin was a defensive back at the University of Missouri and entered the coaching ranks as a graduate assistant with the team in 1965. He was Missouri's defensive coordinator from 1971 to 1976.

Pre-NFL coaching
He was the defensive coordinator for the BC Lions of the CFL and for the Philadelphia / Baltimore Stars of the USFL.

NFL coaching

Chicago Bears

His first coaching job in the National Football League was as the defensive coordinator for the Chicago Bears in 1986, one year following their legendary 1985 Super Bowl winning season. Tobin filled the role left by legendary defensive coordinator Buddy Ryan, who had left the team to become the head coach of the Philadelphia Eagles. While the Bears' defensive unit ranked among the league's highest during his tenure, they never achieved the same dominance as they did in 1985, the team's only playoff wins coming over Ryan's Eagles in 1988's Fog Bowl and in 1991 against New Orleans. Following the 1992 firing of head coach Mike Ditka, Tobin was released with the rest of the Bears coaching staff.

Indianapolis Colts
Tobin was hired in 1994 to be the defensive coordinator of the Indianapolis Colts by his brother Bill Tobin, the team's acting general manager. He left the team following the 1995 season.

Arizona Cardinals
He was the head coach of the Cardinals in 1996 and succeeded Buddy Ryan again. His one winning season and playoff berth as a head coach came in 1998 where the club posted a 9-7 record. He then coached the Cardinals to their first playoff win in 50 years during the 1998 season by defeating the 3rd-seeded Dallas Cowboys. The team lost the next week to the 1st-seeded Minnesota Vikings. After 7 games of the 2000 season, Tobin was fired after posting a 2–5 record. His record in Arizona was 28–43, with a 1–1 postseason record.

Detroit Lions
In 2001 Tobin was hired as the defensive coordinator for the Detroit Lions, where the club posted a 2–14 record. He was fired after 1 season.

Head coaching record

Personal life
Vince Tobin's brother is Bill Tobin. Bill was the general manager of the Chicago Bears and the Indianapolis Colts. Vince served as Colts defensive coordinator while Bill was general manager.

References

External links
 Biography at Packers.com
 Pro Football Reference – Cardinals statistics under Tobin

1943 births
Living people
American football safeties
Arizona Cardinals head coaches
BC Lions coaches
Chicago Bears coaches
Detroit Lions coaches
Green Bay Packers coaches
Indianapolis Colts coaches
Missouri Tigers football coaches
Missouri Tigers football players
National Football League defensive coordinators
United States Football League coaches
People from Nodaway County, Missouri